In numerical analysis, Steffensen's method is a root-finding technique named after Johan Frederik Steffensen which is similar to Newton's method. Steffensen's method also achieves quadratic convergence, but without using derivatives as Newton's method does.

Simple description
For some functions, Steffensen's method can work even if this condition is not met, but in such a case, the starting value  must be very close to the actual solution  and convergence to the solution may be slow.

Given an adequate starting value  a sequence of values  can be generated using the formula below. When it works, each value in the sequence is much closer to the solution   than the prior value. The value  from the current step generates the value  for the next step, via this formula:

for  where the slope function  is a composite of the original function  given by the following formula:

or perhaps more clearly,

where  is a step-size between the last iteration point, and an auxiliary point located at 

It is only for the purpose of finding  for this auxiliary point that the value of the function  must be an adequate correction to get closer to its own solution, and for that reason fulfill the requirement that  For all other parts of the calculation, Steffensen's method only requires the function  to be continuous and to actually have a nearby solution.

Advantages and drawbacks
The main advantage of Steffensen's method is that it has quadratic convergence like Newton's method – that is, both methods find roots to an equation  just as 'quickly'. In this case quickly means that for both methods, the number of correct digits in the answer doubles with each step. But the formula for Newton's method requires evaluation of the function's derivative  as well as the function  while Steffensen's method only requires  itself. This is important when the derivative is not easily or efficiently available.

The price for the quick convergence is the double function evaluation: Both  and  must be calculated, which might be time-consuming if  is a complicated function. For comparison, the secant method needs only one function evaluation per step. The secant method increases the number of correct digits by "only" a factor of roughly 1.6 per step, but one can do twice as many steps of the secant method within a given time. Since the secant method can carry out twice as many steps in the same time as Steffensen's method,

Derivation using Aitken's delta-squared process
The version of Steffensen's method implemented in the MATLAB code shown below can be found using the Aitken's delta-squared process for accelerating convergence of a sequence. To compare the following formulae to the formulae in the section above, notice that  This method assumes starting with a linearly convergent sequence and increases the rate of convergence of that sequence.

then

so

and hence
 

Solving for the desired limit of the sequence  gives:

which results in the more rapidly convergent sequence:

Code example

In Matlab 

Here is the source for an implementation of Steffensen's Method in MATLAB.

function Steffensen(f,p0,tol)
% This function takes as inputs: a fixed point iteration function, f, 
% and initial guess to the fixed point, p0, and a tolerance, tol.
% The fixed point iteration function is assumed to be input as an
% inline function. 
% This function will calculate and return the fixed point, p, 
% that makes the expression f(x) = p true to within the desired 
% tolerance, tol.

format compact % This shortens the output.
format long    % This prints more decimal places.

for i=1:1000   % get ready to do a large, but finite, number of iterations.
               % This is so that if the method fails to converge, we won't
               % be stuck in an infinite loop.
    p1=f(p0);  % calculate the next two guesses for the fixed point.
    p2=f(p1);
    p=p0-(p1-p0)^2/(p2-2*p1+p0) % use Aitken's delta squared method to
                                % find a better approximation to p0.
    if abs(p-p0)<tol  % test to see if we are within tolerance.
        break         % if we are, stop the iterations, we have our answer.
    end
    p0=p;              % update p0 for the next iteration.
end
if abs(p-p0)>tol       % If we fail to meet the tolerance, we output a
                       % message of failure.
    'failed to converge in 1000 iterations.'
end

In Python

Here is the source for an implementation of Steffensen's Method in Python.

from typing import Callable, Iterator
Func = Callable[[float], float]

def g(f: Func, x: float, fx: float) -> Func:
    """First-order divided difference function.

    Arguments:
        f: Function input to g
        x: Point at which to evaluate g
        fx: Function f evaluated at x 
    """
    return lambda x: f(x + fx) / fx - 1

def steff(f: Func, x: float) -> Iterator[float]:
    """Steffenson algorithm for finding roots.

    This recursive generator yields the x_{n+1} value first then, when the generator iterates,
    it yields x_{n+2} from the next level of recursion.

    Arguments:
        f: Function whose root we are searching for
        x: Starting value upon first call, each level n that the function recurses x is x_n
    """
    while True:    
        fx = f(x)
        gx = g(f, x, fx)(x)
        if gx == 0:
            break
        else:
            x = x - fx / gx    # Update to x_{n+1}
            yield x            # Yield value

Generalization
Steffensen's method can also be used to find an input  for a different kind of function  that produces output the same as its input:   for the special value  Solutions like  are called fixed points. Many of these functions can be used to find their own solutions by repeatedly recycling the result back as input, but the rate of convergence can be slow, or the function can fail to converge at all, depending on the individual function. Steffensen's method accelerates this convergence, to make it quadratic.

For orientation, the root function  and the fixed-point functions are simply related by  where  is some scalar constant small enough in magnitude to make  stable under iteration, but large enough for the non-linearity of the function  to be appreciable. All issues of a more general Banach space vs. basic real numbers being momentarily ignored for the sake of the comparison.

If division is possible in the Banach space, the linear operator  can be obtained from

Which may provide some insight. (The quotient form is shown for orientation; it is not required per se.) Expressed in this way, the linear operator  can be more easily seen to be an elaborate version of the divided difference  discussed in the first section, above. Note that the division is not necessary; the only requirement is that the operator  satisfy the equation marked with the segno, .

For the basic real number function , given in the first section, the function simply takes in and puts out real numbers. There, the function  is a divided difference. In the generalized form here, the operator  is the analogue of a divided difference for use in the Banach space.

Steffensen's method is then very similar to the Newton's method, except that it uses the divided difference  instead of the derivative  Note that for arguments  close to some fixed point , fixed point functions  and their linear operators  meeting the marked  condition,  where  is the identity operator.

The generalized iteration formula is given by

 

for 

If the operator  satisfies

 

for some constant  then the method converges quadratically to a fixed point of  if the initial approximation  is 'sufficiently close' to the desired solution  that satisfies

Notes

References
 

Quasi-Newton methods